This is a list of convention centers in Puerto Rico.

Convention centers
 Centro de Convenciones de Ponce
 Guayama Convention Center
 Puerto Rico Convention Center

References

Convention
Puerto Rico